Proetida is an order of trilobite that lived from the Ordovician to the Permian. It was the last order of trilobite to go extinct, finally dying out in the Permian-Triassic extinction event.

Description 

These typically small trilobites resemble those of the order Ptychopariida, from which the new order Proetida was separated in 1975 by Fortey and Owens. Like the order Phacopida, the proetids have exoskeletons that sometime have pits or small tubercles, especially on the glabella (middle portion of the head). Because of their resemblance to the Ptychopariida in some features, the proetids are included in the subclass Librostoma.

Unlike the trilobites of the phacopid suborder Phacopina, whose eyes are schizochroal, the proetids have the more common holochroal eyes. These eyes are characterized by close packing of biconvex lenses beneath a single corneal layer that covers all of the lenses. Each lens is generally hexagonal in outline and in direct contact with the others. They range in number from one to more than 15,000 per eye. Eyes are usually large, and because the individual lenses are hard to make out, they look smooth and sometimes bead-like.

The thorax of proetids was made up of anywhere between 8–22 segments, but most commonly 10. Many also extend the backcorners of the headshield into so-called genal spines. These two features can aid in distinguishing proetids from some phacopid trilobites in the suborder Phacopina, to which they can be very similar.

Classification 

Opinions about the composition of and the affinities within the proetids, and to other trilobites, have been very divergent over time. In 2011 it was suggested to retain in  Proetida only the families Proetidae and Tropidocoryphidae. The remainder of the families should be combined in a new proposed order, Aulacopleurida (Adrian, 2011), that would consist of the families Aulacopleuridae, Brachymetopidae, Dimeropygidae, Rorringtoniidae, Scharyiidae, Bathyuridae, Telephinidae, Holotrachelidae and Hystricuridae (considered Proetida before), combined with the Ptychopariid families Alokistocaridae, Crepicephalidae, Ehmaniellidae, Marjumiidae, Solenopleuridae and Tricrepicephalidae.

The reasoning for this proposed split is based on differences in early larval stages. While the remaining Proetida taxa have globular larvae very unlike the adult form, the Aulacopleurids have adultlike larvae with paired spines. Others observe that globular non-adult larvae also occur in some taxa within the proposed order Aulacopleurida. More recently phylogenetic analysis of both larval and adult characters suggests the proetids as earlier understood probably are monophyletic. Two larval characters are unique to all Proetida; the first is that the eye develops on the side of the headshield, not at the front, and the second is a forwardly tapering glabella that is distanced from the rim of the headshield.

The analysis identifies the taxa Asaphida, Olenina and Phacopida (including the Holotrachelidae) as sister groups. The earliest branch in Proetida is the family Hystricuridae. This is followed by a branch that consists of the families Dimeropygidae and Toernquistiidae. At the third node, the superfamily Aulacopleuroidea (consisting of Aulacopleuridae and Brachymetopidae) split off. The fourth branch is the family Scharyiidae. The fifth branch consists of the families Roringtoniidae and Tropidocoryphidae. The sixth node combines a restricted Bathyuridae split off from Bathyurella with the family Proetidae (including Phillipsiidae, which, according to Lamsdell, has been demoted to the subfamily Phillipsiinae).

Taxonomy
The following superfamilies, families and genera are recognized:

Superfamily Aulacopleuroidea
Family Aulacopleuridae
Aulacopleura 
Aulacopleuroides 
Beggaspis
Chamaeleoaspis 
Coignops 
Cyphaspides 
Cyphaspis 
Dixiphopyge 
Harpidella 
Latecephalus 
Malimanaspis 
Maurotarion 
Namuropyge 
Otarion 
Otarionides 
Protocyphaspides 
Pseudotrinodus 
Songkania 
Tilsleyia
Family Brachymetopidae
Acutimetopus 
Asiagena 
Australosutra 
Brachymetopella 
Brachymetopus 
Cheiropyge 
Conimetopus 
Cordania 
Eometopus 
Loeipyge 
Mystrocephala 
Proetidea 
Radnoria 
Spinimetopus
Family Rorringtoniidae
Cyamella 
Hanjiangaspis 
Isbergia 
Madygenia 
Protarchaeogonus 
Rorringtonia 
Solariproetus

Superfamily Bathyuroidea

Family Bathyuridae
Acidiphorus 
Aksuaspis 
Aponileus
Bathyurellus 
Bathyurus 
Benthamaspis 
Bolbocephalus 
Catochia 
Ceratopeltis 
Eleutherocentrus 
Ermanella 
Gignopeltis 
Grinnelaspis 
Hadrohybus 
Jeffersonia 
Licnocephala 
Lutesvillia 
Madaraspis 
Peltabellia 
Petigurus 
Platyantyx 
?Proscharyia 
Psephosthenaspis 
Pseudoolenoides 
Punka 
Rananasus 
Randaynia 
Raymondites 
Sinobathyurus 
Strigigenalis 
Uromystrum
Family Dimeropygidae (including Celmidae)
Celmus 
Dimeropyge 
Dimeropygiella 
Glaphurella 
Ischyrotoma 
Pseudohystricurus
Family Holotrachelidae
Holotrachelus
Kinderlania
Family Hystricuridae
Amblycranium
Etheridgaspis
Flectihystricurus
Genalaticurus
Glabretina
Guizhouhystricurus
Hillyardina
Hintzecurus
?Holubaspis
Hyperbolochilus
Hystricurus
Ibexicurus
Lavadamia
Nyaya
Omuliovia
Pachycranium
Paenebeltella
Parahystricurus
Paraplethopeltis
Politicurus
Psalikilopsis
Psalikilus
Rollia
Rossicurus
Tanybregma
?Taoyuania
Tasmanaspis
Tersella
Family Raymondinidae (including Glaphuridae)
Glaphurina
Glaphurus
Raymondina
Tagazella
Varanella 
Family Telephinidae
Carolinites
Fialoides
Goniophrys
Oopsites
Opipeuterella
Paraphorocephala
Phorocephala
?Pyraustocranium
Telephina
Telephops
Family Toernquistiidae
Chomatopyge
Mesotaphraspis
Toernquistia
?Toernquistina

Superfamily Proetoidea
 
Family Phillipsiidae
Acanthophillipsia
Acropyge
Ameropiltonia
Ameura
Ampulliglabella
Anisopyge
Archegonus
Bedicella
Breviphillipsia
Carbonocoryphe
Cummingella
Delaria
Ditomopyge
Doublatia
Griffithidella
Griffithides
Grossoproetus
Hentigia
Hesslerides
Hildaphillipsia
Iranaspidion
Jimbokranion
Kollarcephalus
Microphillipsia
Neoproetus
Nipponaspis 
Novoameura 
Nunnaspis
Paraphillipsia
Persia
Phillibole
Phillipsia
Piltonia
Pseudophillipsia
Simulopaladin
Spinibole
Thaiaspis
Thigriffides
Timoraspis
Triproetus
Vidria
Weania
Family Proetidae 
Aayemenaytcheia
Aceroproetus
Alaskalethe
Altajaspis
Anambon
Anglibole
Angustibole
Anujaspis
Appendicysta
Aprathia
Archaeocoryphe
Ascetopeltis
Astroproetus
Australokaskia
Bailielloides
Bapingaspis
Basidechenella
Beleckella
Belgibole
Benesovella
Bitumulina
Blodgettia
Bohemiproetus
Bolivicrania
Boliviproetus
Bollandia
Bonnaspidella
Borealia
Brevibole
Burgesina
Calybole
Camsellia
Carbonoproetus
Carlopsia
Carniphillipsia
Ceratoproetus
Chauffouraspis
Chaunoproetoides
Chaunoproetus
Chiides
Chiops
Chlupacula
Chuanqianoproetus
Clavibole
Comptonaspis
Coniproetus
Conophillipsia
Constantina
Coombewoodia
Craspedops
Crassibole
Crassiproetus
Cyphinioides
Cyphoproetus
Cyrtodechenella
Cyrtoproetus
Cyrtosymbole
Cystispina
Daihuaia
Dayinaspis
Dechenella
Dechenelloides
Dechenellurus
Deinoproetus
Deltadechenella
Diabole
Diacoryphe
Drevermannia
Dudu
Dushania
Effops
Ejinoproetus
Elegenodechenella
Elimaproetus
Elliptophillipsia
Endops
Engelomorrisia
Ensecoryphe
Eocyphinium
Eocyrtosymbole
Eodrevermannia
Eomicrophillipsia
Eopalpebralia
Eosoproetus
Eowinterbergia
Erbenaspis
Erbenites
Evagena
Exochops
Flexidechenella
Formonia
Francenaspis
Franconicabole
Frithjofia
Fuscinipyge
Ganinella
Gapeevella
Geigibole
Georhithronella
Gerastos
Gitarra
Globusia
Globusiella
Globusoidea
Gomiites
Gracemerea
Hassiabole
Hedstroemia
Helioproetus
Helmutia
Helokybe
Humeia
Humilogriffithides
Hunanoproetus
Hypaproetus
Jinia
Karginella
Kaskia
Kathwaia
Kerpenella
Khalfinella
Kolymoproetus
Kosovoproetus
Krambedrysia
Kulmiella
Kulmogriffithides
Lacunoporaspis
Laevibole
Langgonbole
Latibole
Latiglobusia
Latiproetus
Lauchellum
Lichanocoryphe
Linguaphillipsia
Liobole
Liobolina
Longilobus
Longiproetus
Lophiokephalion
Lugalella
Luojiashania
Macrobole
Mahaiella
Malayaproetus
Malchi
Mannopyge
Megaproetus
Menorcaspis
Merebolina
Metaphillipsia
Mezzaluna
Microspatulina
Mirabole
Monodechenella
Moravocoryphe
Moschoglossis
Myoproetus
Namuraspis
Neogriffithides
Neokaskia
Nitidocare
Nodiphillipsia
Oehlertaspis
Oidalaproetus
Orbitoproetus
Ormistonaspis
Omlistonia
Ormistoniella
Osmolskia
Otodechenella
Paladin
Palaeophillipsia
Paleodechenella
Palpebralia
Panibole
Parachaunoproetus
Paradechenella
Parafrithjofia
Paraglobusia
Paragriffithides
Paramirabole
Parangustibole
Parapalpebralia
Paraproetus
Parawarburgella
Particeps
Parvidumus
Paryfenus
Pedinocoryphe
Pedinodechenella
Perexigupyge
Perliproetus
Phillibolina
Philliboloides
Phyllaspis
Planilobus
Planokaskia
Plesiowensus
Podoliproetus
Pontipalpebralia
Praedechenella
Pragoproetus
Prantlia
Prodiacoryphe
Proetocephalus
Proetus
Pseudobollandia
Pseudocyrtosymbole
Pseudodechenella
Pseudodudu
Pseudogerastos
Pseudoproetus
Pseudosilesiops
Pseudospatulina
Pseudowaribole
Pudoproetus
Pulcherproetus
Pusillabole
Raerinproetus
Reediella
Rhenocynproetus
Rhenogriffides
Richterella
Rijckholtia
Rosehillia
Rugulites
Schaderthalaspis
Schizophillipsia
Schizoproetina
Schizoproetoides
Schizoproetus
Semiproetus
Sevillia
Silesiops
Simaproetus
Sinobole
Sinocyrtoproetus
Sinopaladin
Sinoproetus
Sinosymbole
Skemmatocare
Skemmatopyge
Spatulata
Spergenaspis
Spinibolops
Struveproetus
Sulcubole
Tawstockia
Taynaella
Tcherkesovia
Tetinia
Thaiaspella
Thalabaria
Thebanaspis
Tropidocare
Tschernyschewiella
Typhloproetus
Unguliproetus
Vandergrachtia
Vittaella
Wagnerispina
Waideggula
Waigatchella
Warburgella
Waribole
Weberiphillipsia
Westropia
Weyeraspis
Winiskia
Winterbergia
Witryides
Xenadoche
Xenoboloides
Xenocybe
Xenodechenella
Xiangzhongella
Xiushuiproetus
Yanshanaspis
Yichangaspis
Yishanaspis
Yuanjia
Zhegangula
Zhejiangoproetus
Family Tropidocoryphidae
Alberticoryphe
Astycoryphe
Bojocoryphe
Buchiproetus
Centriproetus
Cornuproetus
Cyrtosymboloides
Dalarnepeltis
Dalejeproetus
Decoroproetus
Denemarkia
Diademaproetus
Dipharangus
Eopiriproetus
Erbenicoryphe
Eremiproetus
Galbertianus
Gracilocoryphe
Gruetia
Guilinaspis
Ignoproetus
Interproetus
Koneprusites
Krohbole
Lardeuxia
Laticoryphe
Lepidoproetus
Linguaproetus
Lodenicia
Longicoryphe
Macroblepharum
Miriproetus
Nagaproetus
Paraeremiproetus
Paralardeuxia
Paralepidoproetus
Parvigena
Perakaspis
Phaetonellus
Phaseolops
Piriproetoides
Piriproetus
Pribylia
Prionopeltis
Prodrevermannia
Proetina
Proetopeltis
Pterocoryphe
Pteroparia
Quadratoproetus
Rabuloproetus
Ranunculoproetus
Remacutanger
Richteraspis
Rokycanocoryphe
Sculptoproetus
Slimanella
Spinoproetus
Stenoblepharum
Tafilaltaspis
Tropicoryphe
Tropidocoryphe
Vicinoproetus
Voigtaspis
Wolayella
Xiphogonium
Zetaproetus

References

 
Trilobite orders
Early Ordovician first appearances
Lopingian extinctions
Taxa named by Richard Fortey